Horst Niehaus (born 23 July 1968) is a Costa Rican swimmer. He competed in three events at the 1988 Summer Olympics.

References

1968 births
Living people
Costa Rican male swimmers
Olympic swimmers of Costa Rica
Swimmers at the 1988 Summer Olympics
Place of birth missing (living people)